Naval Submarine Base Kings Bay is a base of the United States Navy located adjacent to the city of St. Marys in Camden County, Georgia, on the East River in southeastern Georgia, and  from Jacksonville, Florida. The Submarine Base is the U.S. Atlantic Fleet's home port for U.S. Navy Fleet ballistic missile nuclear submarines capable of being armed with Trident missile nuclear weapons.

History

The early years
Archaeological research has revealed a pre-Columbian era Indian presence throughout the area, dating back thousands of years.

Early in the 19th century, much of what is now the submarine base was the site of several plantations, including Cherry Point, Harmony Hall, New Canaan, Marianna and Kings Bay. Beginning in the 1790s, Thomas King built a plantation along the bay. John Houston McIntosh built a considerably larger plantation known as New Canaan, where he grew cotton and sugar cane.

The plantation system declined following the Civil War, and the land was broken up into smaller holdings. No residents were paid the going rate for the land that was used to build the submarine base. One land owner was paid four thousand dollars for 62 acres of deep water land. Such residents harvested shrimp, fish and other seafood, and trapped and hunted to supplement small-scale farming of corn, sugar and other vegetables.

The Army years
The US Army began to acquire  of land at Kings Bay in 1954 to build a military ocean terminal to ship ammunition in case of a national emergency. Construction began in 1955 and was completed in 1958. A 200-foot-wide channel was dredged to Cumberland Sound, and included two turning basins.

The most prominent feature of the terminal was its ,  concrete-and-steel wharf (600 m × 26 m). It had three parallel railroad tracks, enabling the simultaneous loading of several ammunition ships from rail cars and trucks.

Elsewhere on the base, the Army laid  of railroad tracks. Spurs off the main line ran into temporary storage areas protected by earthen barricades. These mounds of dirt, still prominent features in many areas of the base, were designed to localize damage in case of explosive accidents.

It was soon realized that there was no immediate operational need for the installation, so it was placed in an inactive ready status, and Blue Star Shipping Company signed a lease to use the wharf in 1959.

Although the army post was never activated to serve its primary purpose, it was used twice for other missions. In 1964, as Hurricane Dora hammered the area, nearly 100 area residents were sheltered aboard base. Also, during the Cuban Missile Crisis, an Army Transportation Battalion of 1,100 personnel and 70 small boats took up position at Kings Bay.

The Navy years

The chain of events that led to today's combination of high-tempo submarine operations at Kings Bay and the complex construction project that reshaped the face of thousands of acres of land began in 1975. At that time, treaty negotiations between Spain and the United States were in progress. A proposed change to the United States naval basing agreement with Spain included the withdrawal of the fleet ballistic-missile submarine squadron, Submarine Squadron 16, from its operational base at Rota, Spain, north-west of Gibraltar, giving easy access to Atlantic Ocean patrol areas. Anticipating that this would take place, Chief of Naval Operations James L. Holloway III ordered studies to select a new refit site on the East Coast.

In January 1976, the negotiators initialed a draft treaty between Spain and the United States. It called for withdrawal of the submarine squadron from Rota by July 1979. The U.S. Senate ratified the treaty in June 1976.

After careful review, Kings Bay was selected in November 1976, shortly after the election of Georgian Jimmy Carter as the President. Soon afterward, the first Navy personnel arrived in the Kings Bay area and started preparations for the orderly transfer of property from the Army to the Navy. Naval Submarine Support Base Kings Bay was established in a developmental status 1 July 1978. The base—now Naval Submarine Base Kings Bay, not only occupies the former Army terminal land, but several thousand additional acres.

Preparations for the arrival of the submarine squadron went forward with haste throughout the remainder of 1978 and into 1979. Commander Submarine Squadron 16 greeted the submarine tender , when it arrived at Kings Bay on 2 July 1979. Four days later,  entered Kings Bay and moored alongside Simon Lake'''s starboard side to begin a routine refit in preparation for another nuclear weapons deterrence patrol. Kings Bay has been an operating submarine base ever since that time.

In May 1979, the U.S. Navy selected Kings Bay as its preferred East Coast site for the new  Trident submarines. On 23 October 1980, after a one-year environmental impact study was completed, and with Congressional approval, the Secretary of the Navy announced that Kings Bay would be the future home port for the new Trident-missile submarines in the Atlantic Ocean.

The decision to base the Trident submarines at Kings Bay started the largest peacetime construction program ever undertaken by the U.S. Navy. The program took nine years to complete at a cost of about $1.3 billion. The building project included the construction of three major commands: Trident Training Facility (TTF), Trident Refit Facility (TRF), and Strategic Weapons Facility, Atlantic (SWFLANT).
			
On 15 January 1989, the first Trident submarine, arrived at Kings Bay.

The enormous construction and organizational effort put forth by all the commands at Kings Bay reached their first goal in late March 1990, when the Trident II (D-5) missile made its first deterrent patrol on board the USS Tennessee.

 Post Cold-War Era 

The end of the Cold War and the reorganization of Naval and Air Force strategic weapons forces during the 1990s had a significant effect on the submarine base at Kings Bay. A high-level nuclear weapons policy review recommended that the U.S. Navy reduce its number of Trident Fleet Ballistic Missile submarines from 18 to 14 by 2005.

The decision was made to temporarily decommission the four oldest Ohio-class Trident missile submarines for extensive shipyard work in order to convert them into guided-missile submarines (SSGNs) carrying large numbers (about 150) of conventionally armed Tomahawk cruise missiles. These converted submarines also have accommodations for significant numbers of Navy SEALs or Marines.

Furthermore, several Trident submarines were transferred from the Atlantic Fleet to the Pacific Fleet. USS Pennsylvania departed on 4 August 2003 and USS Kentucky departed on 24 August 2003, bound for the Trident submarine base at Bangor, Washington, as part of balancing the Trident fleet. In addition, both USS Louisiana and USS Maine were transferred to the Pacific Fleet in 2005.

USS Florida and USS Georgia completed their conversions into guided missile submarines in 2006 and 2008, respectively, and now have their home port at the Kings Bay Submarine Base.

 Anti-War Protest 
On April 4, 2018, seven anti-war activists were arrested after breaking into the naval base and committing acts of vandalism after recording themselves dumping fake-blood on the ground while holding banners, spray painting anti-war and anti-nuclear slogans on facility walls and destroying equipment.  The activists, calling themselves the Kings Bay Plowshares 7, were found guilty of three felonies and one misdemeanor. They are currently awaiting sentencing, where they could face up to 25 years in prison.

Major Commands at Kings Bay

Submarine Group 10
Submarine Group 10 was commissioned January 1, 1989, and is the senior commander at Kings Bay. Group 10 is a subordinate command to Commander Submarine Force U.S. Atlantic Fleet. It exercises command over various commands and units assigned, including operational and administrative control of the Ohio-class submarines based at Submarine Base Kings Bay.

Group 10 is the local coordinating authority for all matters assigned by the submarine force commander and exercises direct control over the administration and training of submarine offcrews at Kings Bay. Specifically included in these responsibilities are the proper integration and coordination of the facilities dedicated to training support of the Trident system.

Submarine Squadron 16
, Submarine Squadron 16 provided administrative support for the East Coast-based Ohio-class SSGN submarines. The squadron coordinates planning and executing all SSGN maintenance with Trident Refit Facility and is responsible for all material readiness and fiscal responsibility. The SSGN fleet relies heavily on this maintenance. In addition Submarine Squadron 16 will provide support for SSBNs during and after major overhaul periods.

Submarine Squadron 20
Submarine Squadron 20 provides the same kind of support services as Submarine Squadron 16, except that it is responsible for the East Coast-based Ohio-class SSBN and the strategic deterrence missions those SSBNs undertake.

Submarine Readiness Squadron
The submarine center provides centralized administrative and support services to the submarine squadron assisting them in their responsibilities for material, personnel, training and logistics of assigned and visiting submarines.

Strategic Weapons Facility Atlantic

Strategic Weapons Facility Atlantic (SWFLANT) provides strategic missiles and strategic weapons system support to the ballistic missile fleet. The command is responsible for assembling the D-5 missile and processing missile guidance and launcher subsystem components.

Marine Corps Security Force Battalion
Marine Corps Security Force Battalion, Kings Bay conducts security operations in Direct Support (DS) of SWFLANT. The battalion is commanded by a senior Marine Corps officer and provides security operations as approved by the Chief of Naval Operations, in coordination with the Commandant of the Marine Corps, As of June 27, 2008, MCSFCO was restructured from a company to a battalion. A similar sister battalion is stationed with the West Coast submarine base in Bangor, Washington. In addition to Marine Corps security forces, they are joined by Navy Master-at-Arms and Navy Law Enforcement/Security Officers with the 6490 designator. Both Masters-at-Arms and Navy Law Enforcement/Security Officers are part of the larger U.S. Navy Security Forces.

United States Coast Guard (USCG) Maritime Force Protection Unit

One of the first Maritime Force Protection Units was established by the United States Coast Guard (USCG) at Kings Bay. The Maritime Force Protection Unit provides escort protection for the submarines as they transit on the surface, to and from their homeports.
For protecting submarines the Navy requested a slightly modified design, which added gyrostabilized machine gun, with advanced optics, which was fired under remote control from the ship's bridge. The gyrostabilized gun's greater long range accuracy made it more appropriate for intercepting speedboats laden with a suicide bomb.

Trident Refit Facility 

The Trident Refit Facility (TRF) is the largest tenant command at Kings Bay and has kept a significant portion of the United States Fleet Ballistic Missile submarines at sea since 1985. TRF provides quality industrial-level and logistics support for the incremental overhaul, modernization, and repair of Trident submarines. It also furnishes global submarine supplies and spare parts support. In addition, TRF provides maintenance and support services to other submarines, regional maintenance customers, and other activities as requested.

A state-of-the-art Magnetic Silencing Facility (MSF) provides degaussing services, including ranging and the removal of permanent magnetism for submarines of the U.S. Navy and the British Royal Navy, as well as for steel-hulled surface warships. The MSF is the only facility of its kind on the East Coast, and it is also used for research for development of future magnetic systems. The Defensive Ordnance Support Facility maintains and stores all of the torpedoes carried by the Trident missile submarines for self-defense.

Trident Training Facility

TTF has an essential role in support of the Trident submarines and uses equipment trainers (simulators) to simulate, as realistically as possible, the actual equipment on the submarine. Trainers include damage control, fire fighting, ship control, navigation, and most weapons and engineering subsystems.

TTF's mission is to provide basic, advanced, functional, refresher and team training to Trident submarine crew members and submarine support personnel, in order to increase and maintain the knowledge and proficiency in specific skills and to provide specialized training. The United Kingdom's s, through the Polaris Sales Agreement, also uses the Trident missile and their sailors sometimes visit the Kings Bay Naval Base. Additionally, the Colombian Navy trained at TTF because of the lack of high technology trainers in their own country.

Homeported submarines 

 Guided missile
 
 

 Ballistic missile

Gallery

See also
United States Navy submarine bases
World War II United States Merchant Navy

References

External links
 Naval Vessel Register
 NSB Kings Bay website
 Aerial photos of Kings Bay Submarine Base

 

Buildings and structures in Camden County, Georgia
Military installations in Georgia (U.S. state)
Populated coastal places in Georgia (U.S. state)
St. Marys, Georgia
United States Navy submarine bases